The England cricket team toured New Zealand for three Test matches, 5 One-day Internationals, and 2 Twenty20 Internationals between February and March 2008.

Squads

Matches

Twenty20 Series

1st Twenty20

2nd Twenty20

ODI Series

1st ODI

2nd ODI

3rd ODI

4th ODI

5th ODI

Test Series

1st Test

2nd Test

3rd Test

Tour Matches

Canterbury vs. England XI-2 February

Canterbury vs. England XI-3 February

New Zealand Selection XI vs. England XI

New Zealand Selection XI vs. England XI

References

2007–08 New Zealand cricket season
2008 in English cricket
2008 in New Zealand cricket
2007-08
International cricket competitions in 2007–08